The Bureau of Conflict and Stabilization Operations (CSO) is a bureau of the United States Department of State.

Mission 
CSO’s mission is to anticipate, prevent, and respond to conflict that undermines U.S. national interests. The bureau implements this mission in two complementary ways: through data-driven analysis and forward deploying stabilization advisors to conflict zones. The objective is to inform and execute U.S. strategy, policy, and programs on conflict prevention and stabilization.

Overview 
CSO’s expertise focuses on three key lines of effort: 1) political instability; 2) security sector stabilization; and 3) countering violent extremism (CVE). CSO collaborates with regional and functional bureaus, DOD, and USAID, and details stabilization advisors to posts and Geographic Combatant Commands (COCOMS) requiring specialized expertise.

Core Lines of Effort 

CSO focuses on three lines of effort (LOE) reflecting different aspects of the conflict cycle, and with narrowed definitions, to deconflict with other agencies and bureaus.
Strategic Prevention Includes deliberate efforts to reduce fragility, strengthen institutions, and increase cohesion in priority countries to disrupt likely pathways to violent conflict, instability, and/or political subversion. Bureau policy priorities are supporting the Global Fragility Act and early warning of atrocities, or EWA. Examples of how we implement strategic prevention include our data analytics, atrocity early warning, stabilization planning, and preventing violent acts.
Conflict Resolution This includes negotiation, mediation, and diplomatic efforts to respond to conflict. Regional bureaus often lead U.S. efforts for peace negotiations, but CSO provides technical support. The Bureau provides the reach-back capability for best practices and comparative examples, and we have programs to support peace processes, ceasefires, and conduct table-top exercises.
Security Sector Stabilization  This is a true niche for CSO in the USG, and includes long-term reform efforts.  INL works only with official governments that have political will for security sector reform, and USAID generally cannot work with security actors, so the Bureau was working in a stabilization setting prior to INL. 

Examples of Bureau work includes analyzing and mitigating non-state armed groups, reintegrating former fighters or war veterans, and getting combatants off the battlefield.  CSO efforts enable the necessary, minimum security conditions to prepare for longer-term security sector reform.   

Another example includes disengaging and reintegrating former combatants, mapping non-state armed groups, and reintegrating other groups such as war veterans into society.  For example, in Niger, CSO promoted defections of former fighters from Boko Haram and Islamic State-West Africa and their reintegration into society.  The program helped remove former fighters from the battlefield and reduced the capacity of Boko Haram and ISIS-WA to threaten U.S. persons and interests.  CSO reinforced this effort by deploying a Stabilization Advisor to Embassy Niamey to assist the Government of Niger in establishing a legal framework and implementation plan for defectors. 

The LOE were designed to add value and demonstrate how our efforts are separate but coordinated with other agencies and bureaus.

History 
The Department of State announced the creation of the bureau on November 22, 2011, replacing the Office of the Coordinator for Reconstruction and Stabilization.

References

CSO
Government agencies established in 2011
2011 establishments in the United States